Koyuk is a city in the Nome Census Area, Alaska, United States.  The population was 332 at the 2010 census, up from 297 in 2000.

Geography
Koyuk is located at  (64.931099, -161.158480).  The village is located on the northern bank of the Koyuk River where it drains into Norton Bay.

Demographics

Koyuk first appeared on the 1930 U.S. Census as an unincorporated village. It formally incorporated in 1970.

As of the census of 2000, there were 297 people, 80 households, and 59 families residing in the city. There were 95 housing units at an average density of 20.1 per square mile (7.7/km2). The racial makeup of the city was 4.71% White, 91.92% Native American, 0.67% Asian, and 2.69% from two or more races.

Of the 80 households, 53.8% had children under the age of 18 living with them, 35.0% were married couples living together, 18.8% had a female householder with no husband present, and 26.3% were non-families. 21.3% of all households were made up of individuals, and 2.5% had someone living alone who was 65 years of age or older.  The average household size was 3.71 and the average family size was 4.31.

In the city, the age distribution of the population shows 41.8% under the age of 18, 8.8% from 18 to 24, 30.0% from 25 to 44, 16.5% from 45 to 64, and 3.0% who were 65 years of age or older.  The median age was 25 years. For every 100 females, there were 121.6 males.  For every 100 females age 18 and over, there were 127.6 males.

The median income for a household in the city was $30,417, and the median income for a family was $20,625. Males had a median income of $25,625 versus $11,563 for females. The per capita income for the city was $8,736.  About 29.3% of families and 28.0% of the population were below the poverty line, including 39.7% of those under the age of eighteen and 25.0% of those 65 or over.

Education
Koyuk is served by the Bering Strait School District. Koyuk-Malimiut School serves grades Pre-K through 12.

References

Cities in Alaska
Cities in Nome Census Area, Alaska
Populated coastal places in Alaska on the Pacific Ocean
Populated places in the Seward Peninsula